Walter Pitchford V (born April 24, 1992) is an American basketball player. He played college basketball for Florida and Nebraska before joining Raptors 905 of the NBA Development League in 2015.

College career
Pitchford initially played college basketball for the Florida Gators, but transferred to Nebraska in 2012. As a junior playing for the Cornhuskers in 2014–15, he averaged 7.2 points and 4.6 rebounds in 30 games.

Professional career
On April 2, 2015, Pitchford declared for the 2015 NBA draft, forgoing his final year of college eligibility. However, on June 15, he withdrew his name from the draft, deciding instead to play overseas. He did not manage to secure an overseas contract, and instead tried out for the newly established NBA Development League franchise, Raptors 905. He was successful in earning a training camp roster spot, joining the squad in early November. Pitchford went on to make the final opening night roster for the start of the 2015–16 season, but after appearing in just five games over the first month and a half of action, Pitchford announced his retirement from professional basketball on December 26. Walter then returned to action and began training to become an NBA prospect once again.

Pitchford signed with BC Olimpi Tbilisi of the Georgian Superliga in 2016. He averaged 8.8 points and 5.2 rebounds per game in the Georgian league. He initially signed with the Moncton Magic of NBL Canada in 2018, but was traded to the Sudbury Five in October 2018. In December, he was acquired by the Saint John Riptide.

References

External links
 NBA D-League profile
 Nebraska Cornhuskers bio

1992 births
Living people
American expatriate basketball people in Canada
American expatriate basketball people in Georgia (country)
American men's basketball players
Basketball players from Michigan
Nebraska Cornhuskers men's basketball players
Florida Gators men's basketball players
Power forwards (basketball)
Raptors 905 players
Sudbury Five players
Saint John Riptide players